Felix Propellers Inc, was an American manufacturer of wooden propellers for homebuilt and ultralight aircraft as well as antiques. The company headquarters was located in Camp Douglas, Wisconsin.

See also
List of aircraft propeller manufacturers

References 

Aircraft propeller manufacturers
Aerospace companies of the United States